The African Junior Athletics Championships  is a biennial continental athletics event for junior athletes from African nations. Organized by the Confederation of African Athletics and first held in 1994, only athletes aged 19 or under are allowed to compete.

Editions

Championship records

Men

Women

All time Medal table 
As of 2017

References
General
CAA: African U20 Championships Records 20 April 2019 updated
Specific

External links
CAA web site
Championship medallists 1994–2005

 
Continental athletics championships
U20
Athletics junior
Under-20 athletics competitions
Recurring sporting events established in 1994
Biennial athletics competitions
